Trust Me, I'm a Game Show Host is an American game show that premiered on October 22, 2013, and aired on  TBS. It is hosted by comedians D. L. Hughley and Michael Ian Black.

Premise
Two comedic hosts try to deceive contestants with unique/odd/implausible statements; one is telling the truth and another is lying. The contestant must decide which fact presented by the hosts is the truth in order to win money. After a few chances of guessing which host they trust is telling the truth, the contestant gets an opportunity to choose a true fact from a range of statements to add an additional $20,000 to their winnings.

Episodes

Reception
Melissa Camacho of Common Sense Media gave the show 3 out of 5 stars.

References

External links
 
 
 Trust Me, I'm a Game Show Host on TV.com

2010s American comedy game shows
2013 American television series debuts
2013 American television series endings
English-language television shows
TBS (American TV channel) original programming